Exotic Animal Petting Zoo was an experimental mathcore quartet based in Crown Point, Indiana. They released their debut album, I Have Made My Bed In Darkness, on Mediaskare records. Their second album, Tree Of Tongues, was released August 5, 2012. They have toured with acts such as Fear Before and Dead Letter Circus.

History

Exotic Animal Petting Zoo formed in 2004. Shortly after their conception, they released a 5-song demo. In 2005, the band recruited Scott Certa, as their permanent bassist, which led to the recording of their first EP. Soon after the release of their EP, they got signed by Mediaskare Records. Their debut album, I Have Made My Bed In Darkness, was released in August 2008. Their second album, Tree of Tongues, was released in 2012. Later that year, guitarist Jeffrey Zampillo left the band.

Discography

I Have Made My Bed In Darkness (2008)
Tree Of Tongues (2012)

Members

Current members
Brandon Carr - guitars, vocals (2004–present)
Stephen Carr - drums, samples, vocals (2004–present)
Scott Certa - bass (2005–present)

Former members
Steve Radakovich - guitar (2008-2010)
Jeffrey Zampillo - guitar (2010-2012)

References

External links
Exotic Animal Petting Zoo hometown, lineup, biography
EXOTIC ANIMAL PETTING ZOO
Exotic Animal Petting Zoo reviews, music, news - sputnikmusic

American mathcore musical groups
American musical trios
Musical groups established in 2004
2004 establishments in the United States
Musical groups from Indiana